Ville Wallén (born 20 June 1976) is a retired Finnish footballer who played as a goalkeeper. After his retirement in 2013, he became the goalkeeping coach of HJK Helsinki.

References
Guardian Football

External links
 Profile at HJK.fi
 Stats at Veikkausliiga.com

Finnish footballers
1976 births
Living people
Association football goalkeepers
Veikkausliiga players
Helsingin Jalkapalloklubi players
FC Lahti players
FC Jokerit players
Rovaniemen Palloseura players
Footballers from Helsinki